Methylmagnesium chloride is an organometallic compound with the general formula CH3MgCl. This highly flammable, colorless, and  moisture sensitive material is the simplest Grignard reagent and is commercially available, usually as a solution in tetrahydrofuran.

Synthesis and reactions
Relative to the more commonly encountered methylmagnesium bromide and methylmagnesium iodide, methylmagnesium chloride offers the advantages of low equivalent weight and low cost.  It is prepared by the reaction of methyl chloride and magnesium in ethyl ether.

As with most Grignard reagents, methylmagnesium chloride is highly solvated by ether solvents via coordination from two oxygen atoms to give a tetrahedrally bonded magnesium center.

Like methyllithium, it is the synthetic equivalent to the methyl carbanion synthon.  It reacts with water and other protic reagents to give methane, e.g.,:
CH3MgCl  +  ROH  →   CH4  +  MgCl(OR)

When treated with dioxane, ether solutions of methylmagnesium chloride reacts to give the insoluble coordination polymer with the formula MgCl2(dioxane)2.  Remaining in the solution is the dioxane adduct of dimethylmagnesium. This conversion exploits the Schlenk equilibrium, which is driven to the right by the precipitation of the magnesium halide: 
2 CH3MgCl  +  2 dioxane  →   (CH3)2Mg  +  MgCl2(dioxane)2

See also
 Methylation

Further reading

References

Organomagnesium compounds
Methylating agents
Methyl complexes